One Voice is a studio album by American singer Gladys Knight along with the Saints Unified Voices music choir. It was released by Many Roads Records on January 4, 2005 in the United States. Aat the 48th Annual Grammy Awards, the album became the last recipient of the Grammy Award for Best Gospel Choir or Chorus Album.

Track listing

Charts

Release history

References 

Gladys Knight albums
2005 albums